Young and Dangerous 3 is a 1996 Hong Kong triad film directed by Andrew Lau. It is the second sequel in the Young and Dangerous film series.  Starting from this movie, it is distributed by Golden Harvest Company.

Plot
Weeks after Chan Ho Nam (Ekin Cheng) is elected branch leader of Causeway Bay of the "Hung Hing" Society, "Chicken" Chiu (Jordan Chan), best friends Banana Skin (Jason Chu), Pou-pei (Jerry Lamb), Dai Tin-yee (Michael Tse) and K.K. (Halina Tam) after joining the Taiwanese "San Luen" triad, is reinstated into Hung Hing by Chairman Chiang Tin Sung (Simon Yam). At the same time, rival triad "Tung Sing", led by "Camel" Lok (Chan Wai Man) begins to make a name for itself, establishing bars and clubs alongside Hung Hing's areas of operations. Things become heated when Tung Sing member "Crow" (Roy Cheung) fuels a deep-seated rivalry between him and Ho Nam, with the threat of open war between the two societies. Meanwhile, Ho Nam's stuttering girlfriend Smartie (Gigi Lai), who was critically injured in a vehicular accident and slipped into a coma, reawakens but with no prior memories to her meeting with Ho Nam for the first time. Regardless, Ho Nam assures her he and his friends will protect her. To add in a stick of comedy, Father "Lethal Weapon" Lam (Spencer Lam) introduces his daughter Shuk Fan (Karen Mok) to Chicken, having been good friends and a source of advice for him.

During a business trip to Amsterdam with his mistress and Ho Nam, Chairman Chiang is assassinated by thugs. While the rest of Hung Hing believes the hit was orchestrated by Ho Nam, it is the deranged Crow who ordered the chairman's death, using Chiang's mistress to falsify evidence, framing Ho Nam. While Ho Nam goes into hiding back in Hong Kong, Crow is reprimanded by Camel; to add to his insanity, Crow kills his own boss and makes it look like a Hung Hing assassination. Drunk with power, Crow wants nothing more than to destroy Hung Hing and orders his men to search frantically for Ho Nam, who is quick to realize the ambush and escapes with Smartie, until Crow's men manages to separate the two. In their attempt, Smartie is captured but suffers a blow to the head, restoring her memories. Crow tells Ho Nam if he wants his name cleared and his woman back, he must meet him alone.

Yet, the crazed Crow does not keep his word and kills Smartie in cold blood in front of Ho Nam. Just as Crow is about to finish him, Chicken bursts in and reaches a stalemate with Crow to ensure Ho Nam's safety. The saddened Ho Nam carries Smartie's body out with him and gives her a proper funeral. Now fueled solely on vengeance, Ho Nam decides to march into Tung Sing territory and kill Crow at Camel's funeral haphazardly. Ho Nam's friends and the rest of Hung Hing manage to capture and threaten Tung Sing member "Tiger" (Ng Chi Hung), who tells all of Crow's madness in killing both their societies' leaders. Crow is left nowhere to run from his enemies, and in the midst of a Hung Hing/Tung Sing brawl, he is killed in the funeral pyre. With Crow dead, Tung Sing is left in disarray, and Hung Hing re-establishes control in its territories.

Cast

 Ekin Cheng - Chan Ho Nam
 Jordan Chan - Chicken Chiu
 Gigi Lai - Smartie / Stammer
 Jason Chu - Banana Skin
 Jerry Lamb - Pou-pan
 Michael Tse - Dai Tin-yee
 Halina Tam - K.K.
 Karen Mok - Shuk-Fan / Wasabi
 Simon Yam - Chiang Tin-Sung
 Anthony Wong Chau-sang - Tai Fai
 Roy Cheung - Crow
 Ng Chi Hung - Tiger
 Spencer Lam - Father Lam
 Chan Wai-Man - Camel Lok
 Blackie Ko - Blackie Ko Chi-Wah
 Law Lan - Granny
 Victor Hon - Uncle Eight Fingers
 Lee Siu-kei - Key
 Danny Chan Kwok Kwan - Gangster
 Samuel Leung - Fat Sze
 Nelson Wai Chow - 14K Gangster
 Brendan Chow - Black Boy
 Oscar Au - Retard Boy (9 Long)

See also 
 Young and Dangerous

External links
 

1996 films
Triad films
1990s Cantonese-language films
Golden Harvest films
Films directed by Andrew Lau
Films shot in Amsterdam
Films set in Amsterdam
Young and Dangerous
1990s Hong Kong films